Christian Gottlob Fechhelm (1732–1816) was a portrait and historical painter, born in Dresden. He studied under Mengs, Manjocky, and Hutin, first portrait painting, and then miniature. In the Seven Years' War Maria Theresa commissioned him to paint the portraits of the generals engaged in that campaign for the Military School at Vienna. Fechhelm died at Dresden in 1816. His son, Karl Christian, who was born at Dresden in 1770, and died in 1826, was likewise a painter.

See also
 List of German painters

References
 

1732 births
1816 deaths
18th-century German painters
18th-century German male artists
German male painters
19th-century German painters
German portrait painters
Artists from Dresden
19th-century German male artists